August Scherpenisse (6 January 1912 – 1988) was a Belgian wrestler. He competed in the men's Greco-Roman featherweight at the 1936 Summer Olympics.

References

External links
 

1912 births
1988 deaths
Belgian male sport wrestlers
Olympic wrestlers of Belgium
Wrestlers at the 1936 Summer Olympics
Sportspeople from Antwerp
20th-century Belgian people